Hotline was the fourth studio album from the Pakistani pop duo of Nazia and Zoheb (Nazia Hassan and Zohaib Hassan), released in 1987. It was produced by the Indian producer Biddu. Along with several other albums from Biddu and the Hassan duo, its success in India contributed to the creation of the Indi-pop market. It was also released in the United Kingdom in 1987. It was the best-selling album of the duo after Disco Deewane.

Track listing
 Telephone Pyar - Nazia Hassan & Zahra Hassan
 Hum Aurr Tum - Nazia Hassan & Zoheb Hassan
 Soja - Zoheb Hassan & Zahra Hassan
 Aan Haan - Nazia Hassan
 Khubsorat - Zoheb Hassan
 Teri Yaad - Nazia Hassan
 Paisa - Zoheb Hassan
 Dharti Hamari - Zoheb Hassan
 Ajnabi - Nazia Hassan
 Number Ek - Zoheb Hassan
 Hamaisha - Nazia Hassan
 Kaam Kaam Kaam (CD Release only) - Zoheb Hassan
 Dosti - Nazia Hasaan & Zohaib Hassan

Music
Biddu
Zohaib Hassan

Lyrics
Sabir Zafar
Nazia Hassan
Zohaib Hassan

References

Urdu-language albums
1987 albums
Nazia and Zoheb albums
Nazia Hassan albums